John Glines (October 11, 1933 – August 8, 2018) was an American playwright and theater producer. He won a Tony Award and multiple Drama Desk Awards during his producing career.

Playwright and producer
Born in Santa Maria, California, Glines graduated from Yale in 1955 with a BA in drama. As a writer in children’s television, he worked for seven years on Captain Kangaroo and for four years on Sesame Street. His play In The Desert Of My Soul was anthologized in Best Short Plays Of 1976. His musical Gulp!, written with Stephen Greco and Robin Jones, had a lengthy off-off-Broadway run in 1977.

His plays written for, and originally produced by The Glines, the non-profit organization for gay arts which he co-founded in 1976 with Barry Laine and Jerry Tobin, include On Tina Tuna Walk, In Her Own Words (A Biography of Jane Chambers), Men Of Manhattan (also made into a film directed by Anthony Marsellis), Chicken Delight, Body And Soul Murder In Disguise, Key West, and Heavenly Days. His last play, Butterflies And Tigers, based on stories of the Chinese people during the Cultural Revolution, had an extended run in New York City in 1998. It catered to lesbian and gay male playwrights Jane Chambers, Robert Patrick, Doric Wilson, and Harvey Fierstein.  Other recognizable actors and prestigious writers (across all gender identities and sexual identities)  who in later years worked with The Glines were Matthew Broderick, Jean Smart, Charles Busch, Allen Ginsberg, Lou Liberatore, Jonathan Hadary, Armistead Maupin, Pat Bond, Felice Picano, Ned Rorem, Vito Russo, Robin Tyler, Audre Lorde, Edmund White, Dan Lauria, James Purdy, John Rechy, Fisher Stevens, and Jack Wrangler.

In 1985 he told Playbill, “Nine years ago, [gay] playwrights and actors didn’t use their own names; a gay play meant something pornographic. I thought by using my own name, it would be a forerunner — it would force others to do the same.”

When “Torch Song” won Best Play just two years after public health recognition of the AIDS crisis, Glines said on the national telecast, “This is a stupendous and miraculous moment, and I would like to accept this in memory of Jane Chambers and Billy Blackwell and in honor of all my brothers and sisters.” After thanking Fierstein and others in the company, Glines concluded, “And lastly but most importantly to the one person who believed and followed the dream from the very beginning who never said, ‘You’re crazy and it can’t be done,’ I refer to my partner and my lover, Lawrence Lane.”

Writing last year in The New York Times, Stuart Emmrich said he and his partner, Barry, “were shocked. It was the first time either of us had seen a real-life gay man openly acknowledge a romantic relationship on network TV, much less on an awards program.”

The Times did not cover Glines’ historic speech in its next day coverage, but did quote Natalia Makarova who won for Best Supporting Actress in a Musical for “On Your Toes” thanking her husband “who didn’t help much but wasn’t in the way.” And the newspaper noted that Tommy Tune, who won two Tonys for “On Your Toes,” wore “a bright pink shirt and pink bow tie” and thanked his sister.

Philip Crosby, managing director of the Richmond Triangle Players, an LGBTQ theater group now in its 25th year in Virginia, wrote, “He enabled all the LGBTQ theaters across the country to have the courage to produce the works we do.”

Glines won a Tony Award and a Drama Desk Award in 1983 as producer of Torch Song Trilogy. In his acceptance speech for the Tony, he was the first person ever to acknowledge his same-sex lover on a major awards show. He won the Drama Desk Award and a Tony nomination in 1985 as producer of As Is, and won the Drama Desk Award in 1994 for Whoop-Dee-Doo!

Activism

In 1987, John founded Stamp Out AIDS to raise a million dollars to fight the HIV and AIDS epidemic by selling stamps that people could use like CEaster Seals. He enlisted the participation of  Helen Hayes, Pearl Bailey, Vivian Blaine, Ellen Greene, Richard Dreyfuss, and Estelle Getty.
In 1992, Glines was a founding board member of Broadway Cares/ Equity Fights AIDS, whose longtime executive director, Tom Viola, wrote on Facebook, “John will always be a part of our legacy.”

Concurrently with his theatre work, Glines was a founding trustee of Broadway Cares/Equity Fights AIDS, which grew out of Stamp Out AIDS, the non-profit organization he founded in 1985 as a result of his work on As Is.

Glines was honored by numerous organizations, including the Empire State Pride Agenda (Artistic Vision Award), Parents, Families, and Friends of Lesbians and Gays (PFLAG) (Oscar Wilde Award), the Allied Gay and Lesbian Association of Los Angeles, and Off-Off-Broadway Review (Lifetime Achievement Award).

Chaowarat Chiewvej married John Glines in 2014.

Glines died from complications from surgery and emphysema at the age of 84 on August 8, 2018 at his home in Bangkok, Thailand.  (Gay City News, August 22, 2018)

References

External links
 FROM LYCEUM’S STAGE, A DISCUSSION ON AIDS The New York Times, October 13, 1985.
 
 John Glines papers, 1971-1998, held by the Billy Rose Theatre Division, New York Public Library for the Performing Arts
  THEATER: 'CARLA'S SONG,' A DRAMA ABOUT CHILD ABUSE Stephen Holden, The New York Times, July 30, 1984.
  Review/Theater; Arrivederci Papa, Farce In Drag Stephen Holden, The New York Times, June 29, 1989.
 The Demonstration (a scene from Men of Manhattan) Actors Theatre of Louisville, 1991
 Glines Hopes NY Audiences Will Start Chasing His Butterflies David Lefkowitz, Playbill On-Line, 12 June 1998.
 Adjunct Theatre League Ex-Voters Retain Legal Counsel Playbill On-Line, 26 October 1999.
 Old Plays Are Gold Francine L. Trevens, On the Purple Circuit, June 17, 2003.
 Memorial Foundation for the Arts, Honorary Board Members
 Reviews Written by John Glines Amazon.com
 Personal photo galleries

1933 births
2018 deaths
20th-century American dramatists and playwrights
Tony Award winners
People from Santa Maria, California
Yale University alumni
American LGBT dramatists and playwrights
LGBT people from California
American gay writers